Pardee Homes is a residential home building company founded in 1921 which currently builds new homes and planned communities in Southern California and the Las Vegas, Nevada, metro region. The company was founded by George Pardee Sr, who was joined by his three sons, George M. Pardee Jr, Hoyt Pardee, and J. Douglas Pardee, in the Los Angeles housing boom after World War II. They began building in southern Nevada in 1952, selling affordable homes to veterans for $1.00 down. The homes in the first Las Vegas development were sold out in the opening weekend.

Pardee became a wholly owned subsidiary of Weyerhaeuser Corporation in 1969, one of 5 such Weyerhaeuser companies under the WRECO division. On July 8, 2014, WRECO merged with TRI Pointe Homes now called the TRI Pointe Group, Inc. The Pardee Homes headquarters is located in Pasadena, CA.  Other offices include San Diego, CA, Corona, CA, Valencia, CA, and Las Vegas, Nevada.  The company is currently developing new housing tracts throughout Southern California, including San Diego, with North County, Bonsall, California, and Santee, California as well as in the Inland Empire, including Lake Elsinore, French Valley, California and Beaumont and in north Los Angeles County in Santa Clarita, along with Southern Nevada including Las Vegas, North Las Vegas, Henderson, NV, and Summerlin.

Pardee Homes began building energy-efficient, green homes in 1998 and introduced LivingSmart, a green building program, in 2001. Pardee Homes received the California Governor's Environmental and Economic Leadership Award (GEELA) in 2005, for its sustainable practices. In 2006, Energy Star Partner of the Year for  Sustained Excellence - United States Environmental Protection Agency In May 2011, Pardee Homes became California's first production homebuilder to commit to getting an entire community of homes certified to the National Green Building Standard (NGBS) by the NAHB Research Center, and internationally recognized, an independent third party. Pardee's new LivingSmart Homes in Santa Clarita's Fair Oaks Ranch, will all be built to the Gold-level criteria of the NGBS, inspected at least twice by an accredited green verifier, and Green Certified by the NAHB Research Center.

In 2013, Certified Green Professional and Pardee Homes VP of Marketing Joyce Mason was one of 15 judges in China's inaugural Solar Decathlon, a joint effort of the U.S. Department of Energy (DOE) and China's National Administration of Energy. Organized by Peking University and staged in Datong in Shanxi Province, the Decathlon's Solar Village showcased 20 homes created by college and university student teams who represented 35 nationalities in countries from six continents.

In April 2017, Pardee Homes’ Las Vegas Division received four Silver Nugget Awards from the Southern Nevada Home Builders Association.

References

External links
TRI Pointe Homes

Construction and civil engineering companies of the United States
Home builders
Companies based in Pasadena, California
American companies established in 1921
Construction and civil engineering companies established in 1921
1921 establishments in California
Weyerhaeuser